Achamindri is a 2016 Indian Tamil language action thriller film directed by Ennamo Nadakkudhu fame Rajapandi. It stars Vijay Vasanth, Samuthirakani, Srushti Dange, Vidya Pradeep, Saranya Ponvannan, and Radha Ravi. The dialogues are written by G.Radhakrishnan. The music has been composed by Premgi Amaren. This movie mostly includes the cast and crew from the director's previous film Ennamo Nadakkudhu which was released in 2014 to generally positive reviews. The movie was Produced by V Vinoth Kumar.

Plot

A pickpocket named Sakthi (Vijay Vasanth) is attracted to Malarvizhi (Srushti Dange), a middle-class girl. A straightforward cop named Sathya (Samuthirakani) is about to marry his childhood sweetheart Shruti (Vidya Pradeep). Their lives turn topsy-turvy on the same day - Sakthi is chased by goons for picking the pocket of a gangster; Malar is threatened by the education minister's PA, Kathir (Jayakumar), for filing for a reevaluation on behalf of her maid's daughter; and Sathya is attacked by his own friend and cop Saravanan (Bharath Reddy), as he starts digging into Shruti's death. The movie ends with how Sakthi and Sathya solve the crime.

Cast

Vijay Vasanth as Sakthi
Samuthirakani as Inspector Sathya
Srushti Dange as Malarvizhi
Vidya Pradeep as Shruthi
Saranya Ponvannan as Rajalakshmi
Radha Ravi as Education Minister Karikalan
Bharath Reddy as AC Saravanan
Jayakumar as Kathir, Minister's PA
Thalaivasal Vijay as Collector
Rohini as Lawyer Tamizh Selvi
Karunas as Pattu, Sakthi's friend
Devadarshini as Chellam, Sakthi's sister
Shanmugasundaram as Varaprasadam (Pattu's father) 
Ashwin as Thirumaal
Krithik Mohan

Production

Soon after the release of successful Tamil film, Ennamo Nadakkudhu, Producer V Vinoth Kuar and Director P Rajapandi decided to work together in one more movie. Like his first film, Ennamo Nadakkudhu, Rajapandi's Achamindri is also a genre film — if the previous one was a thriller involving money laundering, this one is centered on an education racket.

Pre Production began in September 2014 . Shrushti Dange was cast as Heroine opposite to Vijay Vasanth. Samuthirakani and Saranya Ponvannan were cast in important roles. Later Radha Ravi was also included for a pivotal role. Pooja of the movie was held in Triple V Records office, helmed by Vasanth & Co founder Mr H Vasanthakumar. Principal shooting began on 10 March 2015 . A superbly choreographed action sequence involving Vijay Vasanth and Samuthirakani was shot at Marg mall. The 1st scheduled was majorly shot in Chennai. Scenes involving Vijay Vasanth & Shrushti Dange were shot in this schedule. Combination scenes of Saranya Ponvannan and Radha Ravi were canned in this schedule. The schedule lasted for 20 days. The major chunk of the movie was shot in this schedule.

A song featuring Vidya Pradeep was shot in Pollachi. A dance number featuring the lead pair Vijay Vasanth and Srushti Dange was shot in the lush green locations of Pollachi.

The entire movie was wrapped up in 52 days with some minor patch work left.

Soundtrack

Music was  composed  by Premji Amaren and Released  on Triple V Records.

Reception

Achamindri opened to mostly positive reviews from critics.

Sify Movies gave an Above Average verdict and stated, Achamindri is an above average commercial entertainer highlighting the irregularities in our educational system.
Indiaglitz  in its review stated  Achamindri can be watched for its message about Education system conveyed with the right impact, the suspenseful narration that keeps us guessing and a genuine twist.
The Times of India gave 3 out of 5 stars. TOI stated that The climax is built chiefly on the strength of the dialogues, and G Radhakrishnan’s lines, though they make arguments that we have heard before (like the government running liquor shops instead of schools), are both hard-hitting and crowd-pleasing that we cannot help but cheer.
Galatta in its review stated that ACHAMINDRI is a decent entertainer with a social message.
Dinamalar in its review stated that  Achamindri is a must watch for Students, parents and Educational Institutions.
The Hindu gave negative feedback (1 of 5 stars) for the movie, criticizing the screenplay.

References

External links 
 

2016 films
2010s Tamil-language films
Indian action drama films
Films about the education system in India
Films shot in Chennai
Films shot in Pollachi
2016 action drama films
Films scored by Premgi Amaren